Robert ("Robbie") Ian Johnston (born 21 August 1967 in Balclutha) is a former long-distance runner from New Zealand who competed twice at the Summer Olympic Games and once at the Commonwealth Games. At the 1992 Summer Olympics in Barcelona he was ninth in his heat of the 5000m and did not advance to the final. At the 1996 Summer Olympics in Atlanta he was 12th  in his heat of the 10000m and did not advance to the final. At the 1994 Commonwealth Games in Vancouver he did not finish the 10000m.

Johnston's best international result was fourth in the 5000m metres at the 1994 World Cup in Athletics representing Oceania.

Johnston made national headlines in August 2020 when he was disqualified from the 50-54 age group at the Athletics New Zealand Cross Country Challenge for spitting, breaching strict guidelines due to the COVID-19 rules at the time.

Personal bests

References

1967 births
Living people
New Zealand male long-distance runners
Athletes (track and field) at the 1992 Summer Olympics
Athletes (track and field) at the 1996 Summer Olympics
Athletes (track and field) at the 1994 Commonwealth Games
Olympic athletes of New Zealand
Commonwealth Games competitors for New Zealand
Sportspeople from Balclutha, New Zealand